Radio Hamburg is a private commercial radio station based on Hamburg, Germany. Established in the 1980s to play popular music of the time, nowadays it plays hits from the 2000s onwards, on high rotation. Their slogan is Mehr Musik, mehr Vielfalt (English: "More music, more diversity"). Its services also include hourly news, weather and traffic reports, and its website features a live web stream.

Since August 2008, Radio Hamburg has been broadcast from the Semperhaus in Hamburg. In the Semperhause are also other stations of the RTL-group like Hamburg Zwei.

Oster-Mega-Hit-Marathon
Translates as Easter Mega Hit Marathon. Since 1989 every Easter the station has a marathon where they play 800 "Mega Hits" over 24–48 hours during Easter. It is usually held in the biggest arena in Hamburg, the Volksparkstadion, which is the stadium of the local football team Hamburger SV, but in the last years, it was held on the street next to the station, with a big stage.

Music
Radio Hamburg plays Hot AC. The most popular show is the morning show from 5 to 10 am. The radio host is John Ment, the weather tells Laura Winter and the traffic reads André Kuhnert.

Distribution
Until September 2020 Radio Hamburg broadcast on the FM frequencies 103.6 and 104.0. But until September 2020 a new station (also from RTL) named FluxFM started to broadcast on the 104.0.
It can also be heard on the web and via DAB+.

References

External links
 Radio Hamburg Official Website
 Radio Hamburg Web Stream

Radio stations in Germany
Mass media in Hamburg
RTL Group
Radio stations established in 1989